New Zealand Olympic medallists's success for New Zealand at the Olympics is often considered to be notable due to the relatively small population of the country ( million as of ). Being located in the remote South Pacific, New Zealanders needed to endure long sea voyages to attend the early Olympics. It was not until the VII Olympiad in 1920 that New Zealand sent its first team. Prior to that, three New Zealanders won medals competing for Australasian teams in 1908 and 1912. On only two occasions since 1920 has New Zealand failed to win a medal at the Summer Olympics, in 1948 at London and in 1980 at Moscow, when only four competitors were sent as a result of the 1980 Summer Olympics boycott.

New Zealand has had a much smaller participation in the Winter Olympics, due to the country's temperate climate, not generally experiencing the severe winters to lowland levels, common in many countries in the Northern Hemisphere. The first New Zealand team to attend a Winter Olympics was in 1952. The nation has only won medals at three Winter games, in 1992, 2018 and 2022.

The sporting rivalry between New Zealand and bigger neighbour Australia has been evident at many Olympic Games. In 1984, some Australian media outlets poked fun at the New Zealand gold medallists, saying they had been sitting down on the job at the Los Angeles Games, where they were successful in canoeing, equestrian, rowing and sailing. The New Zealand media pointed out that New Zealand had finished 8th on the final medals table, and Australia only 14th. New Zealand has finished higher than Australia on the medals table at the Summer Olympics only in 1976, when Australia failed to win a gold medal, and Los Angeles in 1984.

Medallists

At the 1972 Summer Olympics, Bruce Biddle originally finished fourth in the cycling road race. When the original Bronze medallist was subsequently disqualified for drug usage, Biddle should have been placed third. However he was not awarded the Bronze medal as he had not been asked to take a drugs test. Despite the continued efforts of the New Zealand Olympic Committee, the International Olympic Committee refused to overturn its decision.

Pre-NZOC medals

Milestones 
First medal (by a New Zealander): Victor Lindberg (1900, for Great Britain)
First gold medal (by a New Zealander): Victor Lindberg (1900, for Great Britain)
First medal (for New Zealand): Darcy Hadfield (1920)
First gold medal (for New Zealand): Ted Morgan (1928)
First female medallist: Yvette Williams (1952)
First female gold medallist: Yvette Williams (1952)
First double medallist: Peter Snell (1960, 1964)
First double gold medallist: Peter Snell (1960, 1964)
First triple medallist: Peter Snell (1960, 1964)
First triple gold medallist: Peter Snell (1960, 1964)
First quadruple medallists: Ian Ferguson & Paul McDonald (1984, 1988)
First quadruple gold medallist: Ian Ferguson (1984, 1988)
First quintuple medallist: Ian Ferguson & Paul McDonald (1984, 1988)
First Winter medallist: Annelise Coberger (1992)
First female double medallist: Vicky Latta (1992, 1996)
First female triple medallist: Barbara Kendall (1992, 1996, 2000)
First female double gold medallists: Caroline & Georgina Evers-Swindell (2004, 2008)
First male Winter medallist: Nico Porteous (2018)
First female quadruple medallist: Valerie Adams (2008, 2012, 2016, 2020)
First female quintuple medallist: Lisa Carrington (2012, 2016, 2020)
First female triple gold medallist: Lisa Carrington (2012, 2016, 2020)
First female quadruple gold medallist: Lisa Carrington (2012, 2016, 2020)
First sextuple medallist: Lisa Carrington (2012, 2016, 2020)
First quintuple gold medallist: Lisa Carrington (2012, 2016, 2020)
First Winter gold medallist: Zoi Sadowski-Synnott (2022)
First Winter double medallist: Zoi Sadowski-Synnott (2018, 2022)
First Winter triple medallist: Zoi Sadowski-Synnott (2018, 2022)
First male Winter gold medallist: Nico Porteous (2018)
First male Winter double medallist: Nico Porteous (2018, 2022)

Youngest  medallists
The following table lists all Olympic medals won by New Zealanders 20 years or younger.

Oldest medallists 
The following table lists all Olympic medals won by New Zealanders 36 years and older.

Most successful Olympians
New Zealanders who have won two or more gold medals, or three or more medals total:

See also
New Zealand at the Olympics

References

Olympic medallists
 
New Zealand

es:Nueva Zelanda en los Juegos Olímpicos